Landhuis Bloemhof is a plantation house, art gallery and museum in Willemstad, Curaçao. The house was built in 1735 as Landhuis Nooitgedacht. During the 20th century, the house was owned by May Henriquez, a sculptress and writer, and became a meeting place for the art scene of Curaçao.

History
Landhuis Bloemhof was established in 1735 as a small plantation. It was mainly a water plantation which sold drinking water. On the premises, there are water wells, dams, an aqueduct, and several reservoirs. Until 1896, laraha, a bitter orange, was produced on the plantation. Laraha is one of the key ingredients for the liqueur Blue Curaçao.

In the early 20th century, the estate was owned by Max Frederic Henriquez who married May Henriquez in 1935. May Henriquez was interested in the arts. When the couple left for Caracas for business, she enrolled in a sculpture course. In the house, she created a studio, and her estate turned into a meeting place for the art scene of Curaçao attracting artists like Cola Debrot, Corneille and Peter Struycken. Henriquez became known as successful sculptress and author in Papiamentu.

Henriquez died in 1999. Landhuis Bloemhof was turned into a museum and art gallery, and is dedicated to her memory. The studio is in its original condition. The estate contains a large art collection and an extensive library. On the premises there is a large garden, a bath house, and a literary café.

In 2010, an open-air studio was opened for the Surinamese sculptress . It is a cathedral and maze constructed using 30 million thorn bushes, and was constructed over a five-year period.

References

External links
 Official site
 

Arts in Curaçao
Buildings and structures in Willemstad
Museums in Curaçao